Kolbesia is a genus of algae belonging to the family Achnanthidiaceae.

The genus was first described by Round and Bukhtiyarova in 1996.

Species:
 Kolbesia gessneri (Hustedt) Aboal
 Kolbesia sichuanenis P.Yu, Q.-M.You & Q.-X.Wang
 Kolbesia sinica Krzywda, Witkowski & Chunlian Li

References

Achnanthales
Diatom genera